Khwezi Mafu (born 29 March 1998) is a South African rugby union player for the  in the Currie Cup. His regular position is lock.

Mafu was named in the  side for the 2021 Currie Cup Premier Division.

Mafu was accused of violently raping an 18-year-old woman in Port Elizabeth in 2018. These allegations were later withdrawn due to lack of key witness statements.

References

South African rugby union players
Living people
Rugby union locks
Pumas (Currie Cup) players
1998 births
Falcons (rugby union) players